Welsh Fire are a franchise 100-ball cricket side based in the city of Cardiff. The team represents the historic counties of Glamorgan, Gloucestershire and Somerset in the newly founded competition called The Hundred, which took place for the first time during the 2021 English and Welsh cricket season. Both the men's and women's teams play their home games at Sophia Gardens in Cardiff.

History 

Welsh Fire was founded in June 2019 as one of eight teams to take part in the inaugural season of The Hundred. The team was jointly run by Glamorgan, Somerset and Gloucestershire County Cricket Clubs. It was reported that the side might be renamed as Western Fire, to allay concerns in Somerset and Gloucestershire that they were not sufficiently represented by the side, but this did not come to fruition.

In July 2019, the team announced that former South Africa and India coach, and current Royal Challengers Bangalore coach Gary Kirsten had been appointed as the men's team coach. The women's side was due to be managed by Matthew Mott, a former Glamorgan coach and the current Australia women's team coach, but he withdrew and was replaced by his assistant coach, Mark O'Leary.

The inaugural Hundred draft took place in October 2019 and saw the Fire claim Jonny Bairstow as their headline men's draftee, and Katie George as the women's headliner. They are joined by Somerset wicketkeeper-batsman Tom Banton, Glamorgan batsman Colin Ingram, and England batter Bryony Smith.

Steve Smith and Mitchell Starc were selected as the flagship £125,000 signings in the first round and are two of the side's three overseas players. With Ingram and Banton already occupying the £100,000 slots, Welsh Fire sat out the second round. Ravi Rampaul and Ben Duckett were selected in the third round for £75,000 and Simon Harmer, along with Afghanistan's Qais Ahmed (the team's third overseas player), were bought for £60,000 in the fourth. Liam Plunkett and Ryan ten Doeschate were the picks in the fifth round for £50,000 and Gloucestershire duo David Payne and Ryan Higgins were selected in the sixth round for £40,000. Danny Briggs and Leus du Plooy complete the squad, having both been bought for £30,000 in the final round. The final place in the squad will go to an outstanding performer in next season's Vitality Blast 20-over competition.

Australian Meg Lanning was the next pick for the ladies' team.

Honours

Men's honours 

The Hundred
7th place: 2021 (highest finish)

Women's honours 

The Hundred
8th place: 2021, 2022 (highest finish)

Ground 

Both the Fire men's and women's sides play at the home of Glamorgan County Cricket Club, Sophia Gardens Cricket Ground, in the west of Cardiff city centre. The women's side had been due to play some matches at Gloucestershire's Bristol County Ground and Somerset's County Ground, Taunton but both teams were brought together at the same ground as a result of the Covid-19 pandemic.

Players

Current squad

Men's side 
 Bold denotes players with international caps.
  denotes a player who is unavailable for rest of the season.

Men's captains
 Italics denote a temporary captain when the main captain was unavailable.

Women's side 
 Bold denotes players with international caps.
  denotes a player who is unavailable for rest of the season.

Women's captains
 Italics denote a temporary captain when the main captain was unavailable.

Seasons

Group stages

See also 

 List of Welsh Fire cricketers
 List of cricket grounds in England and Wales
 List of Test cricket grounds

References

Further reading 

 BBC: The Hundred player draft – covering the first draft signings for each region's team

External links 

Official web page at Glamorgan Cricket Club

Glamorgan County Cricket Club
The Hundred (cricket) teams
Gloucestershire County Cricket Club
Somerset County Cricket Club
Cricket in Gloucestershire
Cricket in Somerset
Cricket in Glamorgan
Sport in Cardiff
2019 establishments in Wales
Welsh Fire